National Alliance of Independents (in Spanish: Alianza Nacional de Independientes, ANI) was a political party in Chile. It operated only in the regions IX, X and, XII in the southern parts of the country.

In the 2004 municipal elections, the ANI managed to obtain less than 1% of the vote.

On 4 July 2006 the ANI merged with the Regionalist Action Party of Chile to form the Regionalist Party of Independents.

External links
 ANI website

Political parties disestablished in 2006
Political parties established in 2001
Regionalist parties
2001 establishments in Chile
2006 disestablishments in Chile
Defunct political parties in Chile